Norman Vahtra (born 23 November 1996) is an Estonian cyclist, who currently rides for UCI Continental team . He competed in the road race at the 2018 UCI Road World Championships. In 2019, Vahtra won 8 UCI races for Cycling Tartu, an under-23 development team led by ex-pro Rene Mandri.

Major results

2014
 2nd Time trial, National Junior Road Championships
2016
 7th Grand Prix Minsk
2017
 2nd Grand Prix Minsk
 2nd Time trial, National Under-23 Road Championships
 3rd Time trial, National Road Championships
 9th Overall Tour of Estonia
2018
 National Under-23 Road Championships
1st  Time trial
2nd Road race
 3rd Minsk Cup
 National Road Championships
3rd Time trial
4th Road race
 7th Overall Tour of Mediterrennean
 8th Kalmar Grand Prix
 9th Overall Baltic Chain Tour
1st  Young rider classification
2019
 1st  Overall Course de Solidarność et des Champions Olympiques
1st  Points classification
1st Stages 2, 3 & 5
 1st Grand Prix Minsk
 1st Kalmar Grand Prix
 1st Puchar Ministra Obrony Narodowej
 1st Memoriał Henryka Łasaka
 7th Grand Prix Velo Alanya
 7th Overall Dookoła Mazowsza
 8th Overall Tour of Xingtai
2020
 1st  Road race, National Road Championships
2021
 2nd Time trial, National Road Championships
 6th Overall Tour of Estonia
2022
 2nd Overall Tour of Estonia
1st Stage 2

References

External links

1996 births
Living people
Estonian male cyclists
Sportspeople from Tartu
European Games competitors for Estonia
Cyclists at the 2019 European Games